Ester Hernández (born 1944) is a California Bay Area Chicanx visual artist recognized for her prints and pastels focusing on farm worker rights, cultural, political, and Chicana feminist issues.

Background 
Hernández is a Chicana of Yaqui and Mexican heritage. She was born in Dinuba, a small town in the central San Joaquin Valley of California. Her parents and family were farmworkers.

In 1976, Hernández earned a Bachelor of Art degree at the University of California, Berkeley.

Hernández's work has been exhibited both nationally and internationally since 1973. She has received awards and commissions from organizations ranging from the California Arts Council to the National Endowment for the Arts. Hernandez's work is in the permanent collections of nearly twenty national and international museums including the Los Angeles County Museum of Art in California, the Smithsonian American Art Museum in Washington, DC and the National Museum of Mexican Art.

Hernández's archives are housed at the Stanford University Library's Department of Special Collections in Palo Alto, California.

Art

La Virgen de Guadalupe Defendiendo los Derechos de Los Xicanos
La Virgen de Guadalupe Defendiendo los Derechos de Los Xicanos is a 1975 etching and aquatint. This print is in the permanent collection at the Smithsonian Museum of Art

Libertad
Libertad is a 1976 etching.

Sun Mad
Sun Mad is a 1982 serigraph. In this serigraph, the artist turns the widely recognized red-bonneted female figure carrying a basket of grapes on the Sun-Maid raisin box into a skeleton to visually protest insecticides. This screen print is in the permanent collection of the Los Angeles Museum of Art in California, the Smithsonian American Art Museum in Washington, DC and the National Museum of Mexican Art in Chicago.

Describing this image, Hernandez states, "Slowly I began to realize how to transform the Sun Maid and unmask the truth behind the wholesome figures of agribusiness. Sun Mad evolved out of my anger and my fear of what would happen to my family, my community, and to myself."

This image is featured in a 1989 installation titled Sun Mad that is dedicated to the artist's father who was a farm worker from the San Joaquin Valley, California. This installation is in the permanent collection of the National Mexican Museum of Art in Chicago.

La Ofrenda 
La Ofrenda is a 1988 serigraph. This print is in the permanent collections at the Smithsonian American Art Museum in Washington, DC and the National Museum of Mexican Art in Chicago.

This print portrays a woman with a short punk-style haircut facing away from spectators while showcasing La Virgen de Guadalupe tattooed on her back. La Virgen de Guadalupe is a symbol representing womanhood and femininity throughout Chicanx history. By depicting this tattoo on a woman, Vincent Carillo argues that Hernández "questions the gendered power dynamics" that restrict women to the domestic sphere.

Sun Raid 

Sun Raid is a 2008 screen print on paper. This screen print is the permanent collection at the Smithsonian American Art Museum. Hernandez reimagines the classic Sun Mad to condemn the high amounts of workplace raids and the creation of Immigration and Customs Enforcement (ICE) during the administration of George W. Bush on the grounds of “national security”. Sun Raid references this national security strategy as a consequence of globalization, stating it as a “by-product of NAFTA”, the North American Free Trade Agreement that went into effect in 1994. Using visual signifiers such as huipil clothing the skeletal figure, and a wrist monitor that says “ICE”, Hernandez connects the effects of globalization to the forced economic and physical displacement of various indigenous communities that made up a portion of undocumented immigrants largely affected by these national security strategies.

La Virgen De Las Calles
Hernández has played a key role in the Chicano Civil Rights Movement. In 2001, Hernández created La Virgen de las Calles (Virgin of the Streets), a pastel print, to represent the hard working Latina women in a glorified and divine perspective.

Most of Hernández's art is controversial but she creates with the purpose of progressing the rights of the underrepresented. Hernández often draws inspiration from her personal heroines, who include Frida Kahlo, Dolores Huerta, and Lydia Mendoza.

La Virgen de las Calles was special to Hernández because it was important for her to depict the love a Chicana mother has for her family, and how many Chicana mothers just like the one in this piece “‘…[often] work day and night to educate their children because they know this is the greatest gift a parent can give a child.’"

References

External links

 Official website
 The Ester M. Hernandez Collection, 1960-2000(call number M1301; 67 linear ft.) are housed in the Department of Special Collections and University Archives at Stanford University Libraries
 Ester Hernandez Papers, 1972-2005

1944 births
Living people
20th-century American women artists
American artists of Mexican descent
Artists from San Francisco
Hispanic and Latino American women in the arts
Artists from the San Francisco Bay Area
Chicano
People from Dinuba, California
Hispanic and Latino American artists
American people of Yaqui descent
21st-century American women